Africocypha lacuselephantum
Calocypha laidlawi
Chlorocypha aphrodite
Chlorocypha cancellata
Chlorocypha centripunctata
Chlorocypha consueta
Chlorocypha croceus
Chlorocypha curta
Chlorocypha cyanifrons
Chlorocypha dahli
Chlorocypha dispar
Chlorocypha frigata
Chlorocypha ghesquierei
Chlorocypha glauca
Chlorocypha grandis
Chlorocypha helenae
Chlorocypha hintzi
Chlorocypha jacksoni
Chlorocypha luminosa
Chlorocypha molindica
Chlorocypha mutans
Chlorocypha neptunus
Chlorocypha picta
Chlorocypha rubida
Chlorocypha rubriventris
Chlorocypha schmidti
Chlorocypha selysi
Chlorocypha seydeli
Chlorocypha sharpae
Chlorocypha tenuis
Chlorocypha trifaria
Chlorocypha victoriae
Chlorocypha wittei
Cyrano angustior
Cyrano unicolor
Disparocypha biedermanni
Indocypha leucoura
Indocypha silvergliedi
Indocypha svenhedini
Indocypha vittata
Libellago adami
Libellago andamanensis
Libellago asclepiades
libellago aurantiaca
Libellago balus
Libellago bisignatus
Libellago blanda
Libellago celebensis
Libellago daviesi
Libellago dorsocyana
Libellago finalis
Libellago greeni
Libellago hyalina
Libellago manganitu
Libellago miae
Libellago mima
Libellago naias
Libellago orri
Libellago phaethon
Libellago rufescens
Libellago semiopaca
Libellago stictica
Libellago stigmatizans
Libellago sumatrana
Libellago xanthocyana
Melanocypha snellemanni
Pachycypha aurea
Platycypha amboniensis
Platycypha auripes
Platycypha caligata
Platycypha fitzsimonsi
Platycypha lacustris
Platycypha picta
Platycypha pinheyi
Platycypha rufitibia
Rhinocypha albistigma
Rhinocypha angusta
Rhinocypha arguta
Rhinocypha aurea
Rhinocypha aurofulgens
Rhinocypha aurulenta
Rhinocypha baibarana
Rhinocypha bifasciata
Rhinocypha biforata
Rhinocypha biseriata
Rhinocypha bisignata
Rhinocypha cogauta
Rhinocypha colorata
Rhinocypha cucullata
Rhinocypha cuneata
Rhinocypha dorsosanguinea
Rhinocypha drusilla
Rhinocypha eximia
Rhinocypha fenestraata
Rhinocypha fenestrella
Rhinocypha frontalis
Rhinocypha fulgipennis
Rhinocypha hageni
Rhinocypha heterostigma
Rhinocypha hilaryae
Rhinocypha humeralis
Rhinocypha ignipennis
Rhinocypha immaculata
Rhniocypha iridea
Rhinocypha katherina
Rhinocypha latimaculata
Rhinocypha liberata
Rhinocypha mariae
Rhinocypha monochroa
Rhinocypha moultoni
Rhinocypha nubecula
Rhinocypha ogasawarensis
Rhinocypha pagenstecheri
Rhinocypha pallidifrons
Rhinocypha pelops
Rhinocypha perforata
Rhinocypha phantasma
Rhinocypha quadrimaculata
Rhinocypha sanguinolenta
Rhinocypha seducta
Rhinocypha selysi
Rhinocypha spinifer
Rhinocypha spuria
Rhinocypha stygia
Rhinocypha sumbana
Rhinocypha tincta
Rhinocypha trifasciata
Rhinocypha trimaculata
Rhinocypha turconii
Rhinocypha uenoi
Rhinocypha unimaculata
Rhinocypha ustulata
Rhinocypha viola
Rhinocypha vitrinella
Rhinocypha watsoni
Rhinocypha xanthe
Rhinoneura caerulea
Rhinoneura villosipes
Sclerocypha bisignata
Sundacypha petiolata
Sundacypha striata
Watuwila vervoorti

References